Eileen Feng Gu (born September 3, 2003), also known by her Chinese name Gu Ailing, is an American-born freestyle skier. She has competed for China in halfpipe, slopestyle, and big air events since 2019.

At age 18, Gu became the youngest Olympic champion in freestyle skiing after winning gold medals in big air and halfpipe and a silver medal in slopestyle at the 2022 Winter Olympics in Beijing. She is the first freestyle skier to win three medals at a single Winter Olympics. Owing to geopolitical tensions between the U.S. and China and questions around nationality, her switch from Team USA to China drew international attention at the beginning of the 2022 Winter Olympics. 

She is the first naturalized Chinese free-skier, the first American with Chinese ancestry to win a gold medal in any Winter Olympic event (accomplishing this feat on 7 February 2022), and the second Chinese free-ski Olympic gold medalist after Han Xiaopeng. She is the first female Chinese free-ski Olympic gold medalist and joins the list of previous Olympic Chinese female free-ski medalists that include Xu Mengtao, Li Nina, and Xu Nannan.

Time named her as one of the 100 most influential people in the world under the 'Pioneers' category on its annual list in 2022. Forbes listed her as the third highest paid female athlete in the world in 2022.

Early life and education
Eileen Gu was born on September 3, 2003, in San Francisco, California, United States, to a Chinese first-generation immigrant mother, Yan Gu, and an American father. Chinese media refers to her father as a Harvard University graduate. The New York Times reported that there is no public record of him, and Gu has declined to comment about him. Her mother gave birth to Gu at the age of 40 and raised her as a single parent. The daughter of the chief electrical engineer of Ministry of Housing and Urban-Rural Development of China, Yan attended Peking University in the 1980s for her undergraduate and master's degrees in chemical engineering where she was a member of the short-track speed skating team and a ski coach. Yan emigrated to the United States as a student in her twenties, enrolling at Auburn University and Rockefeller University. To pursue an MBA at Stanford University, she moved to the San Francisco Bay Area, where she enrolled Gu in ski lessons at Lake Tahoe and thereby, according to Gu, "accidentally created a pro skier." Yan had a career working for U.S. investment banks and as a venture capitalist between China and California.

Gu grew up in San Francisco's Sea Cliff neighborhood. Gu began skiing at the age of three, joined the Northstar California Resort free-ski team at eight, and won her first national championship at nine. She attended private K-8 Katherine Delmar Burke School and later San Francisco University High School. Every summer, Gu would fly to Beijing to attend cram school for mathematics. She scored 1580 out of 1600 on her SAT. In 2021, Gu graduated early from high school. She earned early admittance to Stanford University, her mother's alma mater, in December 2020, and began her studies in the fall of 2022.

Nationality and citizenship
Gu competed for the United States at the 2018–19 FIS Freestyle Ski World Cup. She has competed for China since June 2019 after requesting a change of nation with the International Ski Federation. Her goal was to compete for China in the 2022 Winter Olympics. She announced the change on Weibo and Instagram, stating that through skiing she hopes "to help inspire millions of young people" in China and "to unite people, promote common understanding, create communication, and forge friendships between nations."

According to Reuters, Chinese state media had previously reported that Gu renounced her U.S. citizenship after she became a Chinese national at the age of 15. Gu has declined to publicly disclose her nationality. According to CNN, "speculation grew after she applied for the US Presidential Scholars Program in 2021, which is only open to US citizens or permanent residents." At a press conference during the 2022 Winter Olympics, Gu sidestepped six different attempts from international reporters to clarify her nationality. Gu was born a U.S. citizen. In contrast to the United States, Chinese nationality law does not recognize dual nationality/citizenship. The Chinese Consulate General in New York told the BBC that Gu would have to have been naturalized or gained permanent residency status in China to compete for its team, though only naturalization, not permanent residency, would confer nationality and a passport as required by the sport governing bodies. The International Olympic Committee confirmed that the Chinese Olympic Committee had presented it with a copy of her Chinese passport as proof of Chinese nationality acquired via naturalization in 2019. There is no evidence that she has given up U.S. citizenship. Her name has never appeared on the U.S. Treasury Department's Quarterly Publication of Individuals Who Have Chosen to Expatriate. Rather than focus on citizenship, Gu chooses to focus on her mixed Chinese and American ancestry. In an interview in May 2022, Gu referred to herself as an Asian American. In other interviews she has said, "Nobody can deny I'm American, nobody can deny I'm Chinese" and "Since I was little, I've always said when I'm in the U.S., I'm American, but when I'm in China, I'm Chinese."

Sports career

In 2021, Gu became the first woman to land a forward double cork 1440 in competition history.

Training 

 Wy’East Mountain Academy - a training facility for Olympic skiers such as Nick Goepper and Alex Beaulieu. According to Mike Hanley, head of school at Wy’East Mountain Academy, Gu's mother paid for the coaching and travel, "These sports are very expensive. So many of the Americans ask for favors. Yan was willing to pay, which is very rare in the action sports industry. She paid for coaching and travel.”
 Woodward Tahoe - a 33,000 square foot Indoor Action Sports Hub training next-generation athletes in snowboard, freeski, skateboard, BMX, freestyle MTB, and cheer.
 Jamie Melton, Head coach of the Chinese National Slopestyle and Big Air Training Team for the 2022 Winter Olympics, Former Lead Action Sports Coach at Woodward Tahoe. Melton has coached Gu since she was ten years old.
 Brad Prosser, New Zealand coach - Prosser met Gu when she was around 11 years old. In 2018, he became the technical coach guide to the Chinese national team for the 2022 Winter Olympics.
 Misra Noto Torniainen - Gu's personal coach for the 2022 Beijing Winter Olympics and the former coach of the Swiss freeski team. Torniainen had coached Olympic medalists Sarah Höfflin and Mathilde Gremaud for the 2018 Winter Olympics.

X Games

At the 2021 Winter X Games, Gu won a bronze medal in Big Air and two gold medals in SuperPipe and Slopestyle, becoming the first rookie to win a gold medal in Women's Ski SuperPipe, the first rookie to medal in three events, and the first athlete representing China to win a gold medal at the X Games.

World Championships

Gu competed at the FIS Freestyle Ski and Snowboarding World Championships 2021, winning two gold medals in Freeski Halfpipe and Freeski Slopestyle and a bronze medal in Freeski Big Air. Gu became the first freeskier to win two golds at the FIS Freeski World Championship. She competed without poles for the first time due to a broken hand, having fractured a finger and tearing the UCL in her thumb.

2022 Winter Olympics

At the 2022 Winter Olympics, Gu became the youngest gold medalist in freestyle skiing, winning the big air event, the first to be held at the Olympics. Gu landed a double cork 1620, her first attempt in competition. She was the second woman to land the trick and the first woman to land a left-turn 1620; Tess Ledeux first successfully completed a double cork 1620 on 21 January 2022 at the X Games in Aspen, Colorado  and landed it again in her first run of the big air final at the 2022 Winter Olympics.

Gu won the silver medal in the slopestyle event. She won a second gold medal in the women's freeski halfpipe competition, becoming the first freestyle skier to win three medals at a Winter Olympics. She was awarded the Best Breakthrough Athlete and Best Female Action Sports Athlete ESPY Awards at the 2022 ESPY Awards.

World Cup results

Gu ended the 2021-2022 World Cup season with a perfect record in women's halfpipe, taking her first career crystal globe and becoming the first freestyle skier to win four consecutive World Cup competitions. She claimed her second crystal globe in the same season, placing first in Park & Pipe overall.

All results are sourced from the International Ski Federation.

 8 wins: 5 Halfpipe, 2 Slopestyle, 1 Big Air
 12 podiums: 6 Halfpipe, 5 Slopestyle, 1 Big Air

Results current through 1 February 2022.

Sponsorships, endorsements, and modeling career 
As a "young American freestyle champion" at Nanshan Ski Resort, Gu had sponsorships in China at nine years old through connections with the resort's owner and China's ski industry. These included several Chinese sponsors, The North Face, and CCTV9.

Even before the start of the 2022 Winter Olympics, Gu was the face of multiple brands in China. Gu fronts at least 23 brands in China across sports, fashion, and banking. Some of her partnerships in China include Mengniu Dairy, Luckin Coffee, JD.com, China Mobile, People's Insurance Company of China, Bank of China, and Anta Sports.  According to marketing expert Jerome Lau, "Gu can be perceived as a bridge for brands to resonate with the consumers in the China market." Gu's status as a leading sports star in China is reported to have earned her over US$30 million in endorsements and advertising contracts in 2021 alone. According to media reports, her average fee per endorsement increased from $1 million in 2021 to $2 to $2.5 million in 2022.

In the U.S., Gu is represented by IMG Models.  She has appeared on the covers of magazines such as the Chinese editions of Harper's Bazaar, Elle, Cosmopolitan, GQ, Marie Claire, V, L'Officiel, and Vogue. Gu has been featured in campaigns for Western luxury brands such as Fendi and Gucci. She is a brand ambassador for IWC Schaffhausen, Tiffany & Co., and Louis Vuitton. She is a Red Bull sponsored athlete and a founding member of Victoria's Secret's VS Collective.

Personal life
Gu was raised by her mother, Yan Gu, and maternal grandparents. In 2002, a year before Gu was born, Yan Gu's sister Ling died in a car crash. Gu's mother decided to name her 爱凌 (Ailing), literally translating to "Love Ling", in her sister's honor. In China, she uses the nickname "青蛙公主" ("Frog Princess") on her Chinese social media accounts. The nickname comes from a green helmet she once wore during competition.

Gu speaks fluent Mandarin Chinese and English. She plays the piano as a hobby. In May 2022, Gu mentioned that she had converted to Buddhism.

Social and political views 
During the COVID-19 pandemic in the United States, Gu has spoken out against anti-Asian racism after the 2021 Atlanta spa shootings and the killing of Vicha Ratanapakdee. She has described her own experience with anti-Asian racism, having endured a man screaming obscenities about "Asians infecting America" with COVID-19 at her and her grandmother in a shop. Gu has also stated that she supports the Black Lives Matter movement and the right to legal access to abortion. Gu has largely declined to comment on social and political topics involving China, including the country's human rights record. Gu's agent Tom Yaps told The Economist that Gu's mother, Yan Gu, feared that "if [Eileen] participates in an article that has two paragraphs critical of China and human rights, that would put her in jeopardy over there. One thing and a career is ruined."

See also
List of Olympic medalists in freestyle skiing
List of Youth Olympic Games gold medalists who won Olympic gold medals

References

External links

 

Living people
2003 births
Sportspeople from San Francisco
Chinese-American culture in San Francisco
Chinese female freestyle skiers
Freestyle skiers at the 2020 Winter Youth Olympics
Youth Olympic gold medalists for China
X Games athletes
Freestyle skiers at the 2022 Winter Olympics
Olympic freestyle skiers of China
Medalists at the 2022 Winter Olympics
Olympic gold medalists for China
Olympic silver medalists for China
Olympic medalists in freestyle skiing
Chinese people of American descent
American models of Chinese descent
American sportswomen
American sportswomen of Chinese descent
IMG Models models